Timothy Watson is a British actor best known for his role as Rob Titchener in BBC Radio 4's long-running soap opera The Archers and voice roles as Mumkhar in Xenoblade Chronicles and Urianger Augurelt in Final Fantasy XIV.

Early life 
Watson was born in Berkshire, England but grew up in Hertfordshire. He studied at the Central School of Speech and Drama in London from the age of 17.

Career 
Best known for his portrayal of Rob Titchener in BBC Radio 4's soap opera The Archers, he has also played the role of the Maitre d’ of the Palm Court Restaurant, Mr Perez, in Mr Selfridge. Watson voiced the characters of both James Bond and Auric Goldfinger in the 2012 video game 007 Legends based on the James Bond movies. Watson also voiced the characters Mumkhar and Metal Face in the video game Xenoblade Chronicles. He would also voice the character Urianger in Final Fantasy XIV, replacing Gideon Emery. Watson appeared in the National Theatre's production of The Beaux' Stratagem.

In June 2008, Watson starred with Honeysuckle Weeks in the BBC Radio 4 drama The Incomparable Witness, about the case of murderer Dr Crippen.

In 2015, the audience at the Radio Times Festival greeted Watson by booing in response to the plotline involving his character Rob Titchener in The Archers. He later told The Observer'''s Vanessa Thorpe, "I have now removed all social media from my house because some of the things people said were quite awful. […] The strength of feeling took me by surprise. And then it starts to impact on your own personal life. I would rather not see it."

In February 2017, Watson participated in live interviews to answer BBC Radio 4 listeners' questions about his experience of acting in The Archers. The following year, in a series of Halloween-themed radio adaptations for BBC Radio 4's 15 Minute Drama programme based on the second book in the Pan Book of Horror Stories series, Watson played the part of Sbirro in Stanley Ellin's short story The Speciality of the House and the title character in Carl Stephenson's Leiningen Versus the Ants.

Personal life
Watson is married to actress and writer Helen Grace; they have two children and live in rural Hampshire.

In 2016, Watson told Radio Times''' David Brown, "I support Compassion in World Farming. I hate mega dairies, they're appalling things. I've got no interest in country pursuits, I've never held a cricket bat, even though as Rob I've managed to cheat during the single wickets in Ambridge. And I hate hunting. I would probably have been standing with the hunt saboteurs instead of falsely accusing one of assaulting me. So the real me probably wouldn't fare too well in Ambridge."

References

External links
 Timothy Watson at the British Film Institute
 

British male film actors
British male television actors
British male video game actors
British male voice actors
Living people
Alumni of the Royal Central School of Speech and Drama
Year of birth missing (living people)
20th-century British male actors
21st-century British male actors